Magic Mirror is a 2005 Portuguese film directed by Manoel de Oliveira. It was shown in competition at the 2005 Venice Film Festival.

Cast
 Leonor Silveira as Alfreda
 Ricardo Trêpa as José Luciano / Touro Azul
 Luís Miguel Cintra as Filipe Quinta
 Leonor Baldaque as Vicenta / Abril
 Glória de Matos as Nurse Hilda
 Isabel Ruth as Celsa Adelaide
 Adelaide Teixeira as Queta
 Diogo Dória as Police Commissioner
 José Wallenstein as Américo
 Maestro Atalaya as Prof. Oboé
 P. João Marques as Priest Feliciano (as Padre João Marques)
 Marisa Paredes as Monja
 Michel Piccoli as Prof. Heschel

See also

Cinema of Portugal

References

External links
 

2005 drama films
2005 films
Films based on works by Agustina Bessa-Luís
Films directed by Manoel de Oliveira
Portuguese drama films
2000s Portuguese-language films